George Birrell Gibb Paterson (29 June 1904 – 1949) was a Scottish footballer who played in the Football League for Stoke.

Career
Born in Fife, Paterson played for local side Lochgelly United, then spent a year with junior club Kelty Rangers before returning to Lochgelly United, where he was a prolific goalscorer in his second spell (albeit in the third tier of the Scottish Football League), prompting English club Stoke City to sign him in 1925. He made an impressive start, scoring a hat-trick on his debut in a 4–0 win against Middlesbrough. After playing seven matches scoring four goals during the 1925–26 season, Paterson become seriously homesick and returned to Lochgelly, who had by then dropped out of the SFL into the Scottish Alliance.

He later went on to play for East Fife (featuring on the losing side in the 1927 Scottish Cup Final), spent a season with Rhyl Athletic, then had a productive five seasons at Dunfermline Athletic which culminated in a promotion as runners-up in 1933–34 Scottish Division Two. Rather than going up to the top level for what would have been the first time in his career, he signed for Leith Athletic, but was released after six months.

Career statistics

References

Scottish footballers
Lochgelly United F.C. players
Stoke City F.C. players
Scottish Football League players
Scottish Junior Football Association players
English Football League players
1904 births
People from Lochgelly
1949 deaths
East Fife F.C. players
Dunfermline Athletic F.C. players
Leith Athletic F.C. players
Rhyl F.C. players
Association football forwards
Footballers from Fife